, also advertised as Doraemon the Movie 2007, is a 2007 Japanese animated science fantasy film. It is the 27th feature film of the Doraemon franchise. It is a retelling of the 1984 film Doraemon: Nobita's Great Adventure into the Underworld. It was the second highest grossing anime movie in 2007 after Pokémon: The Rise of Darkrai.

Plot
The story begins with Professor Mangetsu, a Japanese astrophysicist and his daughter, Miyoko, are informed and startled about the approach of a giant black hole that previously destroyed the space probe Voyager 5. It is confirmed that this black hole will completely destroy Earth and its inhabitants.

Frustrated by the multitude of problems at school and at home, Nobita wonders if his life would be easier if magic really existed. He then asks Doraemon for his what-if-telephone-booth gadget which allows both to go to a parallel world where magic is ordinary to all.

However, Doraemon tells that magic is just a superstition and there is no way such world could be created. At the same time when they re-enter their room, a life-sized statue of Doraemon fell down from the sky, which surprise them both. As they fix the problem, Gian and Suneo call them, finding another statue of Nobita out on the field. Doraemon and Nobita are confused and choose to leave these statues in their backyard. In the night, the family is surprised when the statues appear inside of the house, in another position. Doraemon and Nobita do not have time to find out the truth, so they simply put the statues in Doraemon's magic pocket. At midnight, Doraemon suddenly gets a stomachache and rushes to the 22nd century to check, where his pain stops and he denies to have a scan through to detect the problem. He returns to the 21st century, where Nobita tells him that they can use the "What if" Telephone Booth to materialize a Magic World. This allows them both to go to a parallel world where magic is ordinary to all. There, they find out that a demonic planet is approaching and threatens the lives of everyone ovelled with magic, Nobita discovers that they still cannot use magic, since magic, just like science, is something they need to learn. He is bored again, and wants to return to the normal world. But, because Gian and Suneo tease him on his disability of riding a broom, he is motivated and starts magic training. While learning magic, Nobita and Doraemon find out that using a certain form of magic lifts up Shizuka's skirt. They keep on doing so to catch a glimpse of her underwear, which results in her getting angry. When they finish training, the group see a falling object coming down to Earth. They fly there to examine the crash site, where they meet Miyoko, who is a high-class magic user and knows of a demonic planet that will destroy Earth very soon. He also reveals the secret of Miyoko's mom, who had struck a deal with the Demon King to save Miyoko from a deadly disease. The only way to save Earth, according to Professor Mangetsu, is noted in the tome of magic, written by Nirnaeth, a man who borrowed powers from the Moon, and hidden somewhere on Earth.

Satisfied of what he has achieved, Nobita wishes to go back to the normal world. But as they arrive home, they find the Booth has been dumped by their mom and is broken. The two get into a quarrel. Later, an earthquake occurs and as the news is telecast, Doraemon and Nobita head to Miyoko's home, where they save Miyoko from being killed by a dragon. Miyoko then reveals that her father has been taken to the Magic Planet, and she escaped due to luck, and asks for help from Doraemon and Nobita to save her father. Eventually, she decides leaves alone as she does not want to endanger her friends.

As natural disasters occur more and more, Doraemon's group decide to help Miyoko to find the tome to defeat the demons. While finding the tome, Nobita again accidentally lifts Shizuka's skirt up in front of everyone, to reveal her underwear by using magic. This results in him getting pushed, and hitting in a hidden button which reveals the tome. However, when they find the tome, Miyoko attacks at Gian to get the tome, and removes her disguise and shows herself as Medusa, a demoness under control of the Demon King. She cannot reach the tome under protection of the anti-demon power source, so she has takes advantage of Doraemon's group to help her take the secret paper. She forms a glacier, trying to kill the group by locking them in the ice. But, the group escapes. They find that the tome was actually divided into two halves, which provides them a chance to save Earth. At the same time, they find Miyoko in the appearance of a mouse, whose curse is lifted under the light of the moon. As Doraemon is afraid of mice, the group casts a different spell to turn Miyoko into a cat, as their power cannot lift the curse. United, they then go to the Magic Planet to defeat the Demon King and rescue Miyoko's father.

The group manages to break into the Demon Castle, armed with silver arrows to kill the Demon King by shooting the arrows into his heart, and Moon Torch Light for defense. However, the arrows do not work and they are chased away. Only Nobita and Doraemon manage to escape while the rest are captured and locked inside the Castle. Doraemon realizes that they can undo everything by going back in time to stop the Nobita in the past from requesting to change the real world into the Magical world. But, they are changed in stone by Medusa, who follows them through the Space-Time Continuum.

Doraemi, Doraemon's sister, discovers the statues of the future Doraemon and Nobita inside the pocket of the past Doraemon, and uses the Time Cape to bring them back to their normal forms. Doraemon and Nobita plan to use Doraemi's Phone Booth to return to the real world. But Nobita, who realizes that the world will still be threatened even when they go back to normal, decides to stay and finish the battle with the Demon King. They arrive on the Magic Planet again and rescue their friends, including Miyoko and Professor Mangetsu. They then head to the moon, where they believe Medusa is and trying to destroy the moon's guarding power. The Demon King, enraged by the actions of Doraemon's group, brings his whole army to invade Earth at once.

At the moon, Doraemon's group fails to stop Medusa from destroying the moon's power that protects the Earth. The energy flow flushes out so powerfully that it destroys the demonic form of Medusa, revealing that she is Miyoko's mother. Miyoko and Professor Mangetsu are devastated when they see the truth. Miyoko's mother tells that her soul has been taken away when she dealt with the Demon King, so she cannot exist for long in human form. She also reveals that there is a red moon on the Magic Planet, which is the Demon King's heart, explaining why the silver arrows did not kill the Demon King. She then disappears, while Miyoko and her father mourn. The group, on the flying carpet, then race to the approaching Magic Planet in order to destroy the heart of the Demon King. It is nearly impossible at first as the demon army is too many and the group is surrounded. Doraemon suddenly comes up with a brilliant idea and uses the Anywhere Door to go near the Demon king's heart. Nobita shoots an arrow that has been enlarged by the Enlarging Torch Light, and they destroy the heart, along with the Magic Planet and the whole demonic army.

During the credits, when the final scene takes place, they return to Earth and rebuild Miyoko's home, with Miyoko bidding the group farewell. In the real world, Miyoko and her father, and the whole space center are relieved to see that the black hole vanishes just before reaching the Earth. Nobita then reorders the real world, in which they nearly forget everything about the magic world, and think that it was just a dream. After the credits, Nobita tries to cast a spell, and surprisingly gets the same result as when he tried to cast one in the Magic World. He thinks it was because of the wind, but a scene of a broom on the treetop (the one they used in an attempt to escape Medusa) is shown, showing that everything really happened.

Cast

Nintendo DS Game 
Doraemon: Nobita no Shin Makai Daibouken DS (ドラえもん のび太の新魔界大冒険 DS) is the card battle game for the Nintendo DS system. It has a Nintendo Wi-Fi Connection feature so that players can battle each other online.

References

External links 
Official webpage 
Official movie news  

2007 anime films
Anime film remakes
Nobita's New Great Adventure into the Underworld - The Seven Magic Users
Films directed by Yukiyo Teramoto
Films set in Croatia
Films about magic and magicians
2000s children's animated films
Japanese children's fantasy films
English films
2000s English-language films